The Thruster (French:L'arriviste) is a 1924 French silent film directed by André Hugon and starring Pierre Blanchar, Jeanne Helbling and Ginette Maddie.

Cast
 Pierre Blanchar as Jacques de Mirande  
 Jeanne Helbling as Marquisette  
 Ginette Maddie as Renée April  
 Gilbert Dalleu as Chesnard  
 Camille Bert as L'inconnu  
 Henri Baudin as Claude Barsac  
 Jean d'Yd as L'avocat général 
 Max Charlier 
 Georges Deneubourg 
 Henri Deneyrieu as Le notaire  
 Alexis Ghasne as Le Président des assises  
 Paul Jorge as L'Abbé Bridoux  
 Louis Monfils as Le Président de la chambre des députés

References

Bibliography
 Rège, Philippe. Encyclopedia of French Film Directors, Volume 1. Scarecrow Press, 2009.

External links

1924 films
Films directed by André Hugon
French silent films
French black-and-white films
1920s French films